Ruggles station is an intermodal transfer station in Boston, Massachusetts. It serves Massachusetts Bay Transportation Authority (MBTA) rapid transit, bus, and commuter rail services and is located at the intersection of Ruggles and Tremont streets, where the Roxbury, Fenway–Kenmore, and Mission Hill neighborhoods meet. It is surrounded by the campus of Northeastern University. Ruggles is a station stop for the Orange Line subway, as well as the Providence/Stoughton Line, Franklin Line, and Needham Line of the MBTA Commuter Rail system. Thirteen MBTA bus routes stop at Ruggles.

Ruggles station opened in 1987 as part of the Southwest Corridor, replacing Dudley Street Terminal as the main bus transfer station for much of Roxbury and Dorchester. The station originally had a single island platform serving the Northeast Corridor tracks, which meant not all commuter rail trains could stop at the station. Construction of an additional side platform, replacements of four elevators, and reconstruction of the busway took place from 2017 to 2021. A second phase is planned to add additional entrances to the Orange Line and commuter rail platforms.

Station layout

The sprawling station is elevated above the Southwest Corridor north of Ruggles Street and west of Columbus Avenue - the former location of the South End Grounds. The main station structure, designed by Stull and Lee, is covered by a rectangular "tubular-framed, high-tech" canopy. The arched concourse crosses at an angle aligned with Forsyth Street, with entrances at both ends. Its open ends were intended to symbolize reconnection between Jamaica Plain and Roxbury, historically divided by the railroad alignment.

A clockwise busway wraps around the station, with separate entrances and exits on Ruggles Street, plus an entrance from Melnea Cass Boulevard at Columbus Avenue. The north (upper) part of the busway is level with the concourse and used for drop-offs; the south (lower) part has multiple lanes and bus berths for boarding. A Northeastern University architecture studio is located in the station structure under the upper busway, next to the Forsyth Street entrance.

A total of five tracks run through the station: two for the Orange Line and three for commuter rail (and Amtrak, which does not stop). The Orange Line tracks serve a single island platform on the north side of the railroad cut. The northern two of the mainline tracks serve a second island platform, while the southernmost track has a side platform. The entrances to the two island platforms are located on the west side of the concourse, under the canopy; entrances to the side platform are from the busway and from a walkway from Columbus Avenue. Five elevators connect the concourse level to the two platforms, the busway, and the Forsyth Street entrance.

Artwork

Two "very different" pieces of public art were installed in the station as part of the Arts on the Line program:
Stony Brook Dance, by John T. Scott, is an aluminum abstract kinetic sculpture suspended inside the west end of the concourse. Thirty colorful geometric tubes are attached to three stainless steel cables, allowing them to sway in the wind. The work, commissioned in 1986 and completed in 1989, combines imagery of diddley bows and wave physics.
The work was installed in 1990–91. Painter Goodnight and ceramics artist Yoneoka met in court while the two were separately pursuing lawsuits regarding illegal destruction of their previous works.

The western wall of the station was covered with mural by Sivia López Chavez in 2019. The work – part of a Northeastern University art program – depicts a woman blowing bubbles on a brightly colored backdrop.

History
Ruggles station opened on May 4, 1987 and was built as part of an Orange Line realignment project which relocated the former Washington Street Elevated Orange Line service into the Southwest Corridor. Commuter rail service to the station began on October 5, 1987. Located where there had not previously been a station, Ruggles was built to serve Northeastern University and the Longwood Medical Area, and to replace Dudley Square station as a major bus terminal for the Orange Line.

The busway was originally paved with asphalt, which soon eroded from the stopping and starting of buses. In 1988, the MBTA paid $430,000 to repave it with more-durable concrete. The upper busway was closed for one year ending on February 6, 2006 for a $3.2 million rehabilitation.

The entire Orange Line, including the Orange Line platforms at Ruggles station, was closed from August 19 to September 18, 2022, during maintenance work. Commuter Rail and bus service to the station was not affected.

Urban Ring proposal
Ruggles was a proposed stop on the Urban Ring – a circumferential bus rapid transit (BRT) line designed to connect the existing radial MBTA rail lines to reduce overcrowding in the downtown stations. Under draft plans released in 2008, the Urban Ring would have approached Ruggles from the west on a reserved surface right-of-way on the north side of Ruggles Street. Buses would have used the existing bus loop; the existing side access from Tremont Street would have connected to dedicated bus lanes on Melnea Cass Boulevard. The project was cancelled in 2010.

Renovations

A number of smaller projects in the Urban Ring corridor have been approved; among them was adding a second commuter rail platform to serve Track 2 at Ruggles, thus allowing all commuter rail trains to stop there. Until 2021, about 30% of inbound commuter rail trains bypassed the station, as reaching the platform required crossing over to Track 1 or Track 3. The MBTA began consideration of a second platform in 1993, just six years after Ruggles opened. A preliminary study in 2008 recommended a full-length 800-foot platform located entirely east of the busway bridge.

The MBTA began holding public meetings in 2012. By this time, plans called for the new platform to be located next to the existing platform. It was to be split in two sections connected by a short pedestrian tunnel under the busway bridge; the gap would be short enough to allow all doors on a train to still open onto the platform. In September 2014, the MBTA received a $20 million TIGER grant for the project, which is estimated to cost $30 million in total. Besides the new platform, work would include lighting and security upgrades, elevator improvements, and rehabilitation of the deteriorated northern half of the existing platform, which was blocked off from use.

By March 2016, the project was at 90% design and expected to reach 100% design by mid-2016, when it would be advertised for bidding. Construction was set to begin in late 2016 and last through 2018. In December 2016, the MBTA Fiscal and Management Control Board approved a $1.6 million expansion of the project scope to include reconstruction of the lower busway, elevator replacements, additional station entrances, an additional busway elevator, and other accessibility improvements. Bidding took place in May and June 2017; on June 26, the Board approved a $19.7 million construction contract (lower than the $22 million projected cost). 

A groundbreaking ceremony for the project, which was expected to cost $38.5 million in total, was held on August 22, 2017. Construction was then planned to last from 2017 to 2019. Reconstruction of the lower busway began in April 2018. Replacement of the first two of four station elevators (the Orange Line platform elevator and the Forsyth Street elevator) began on November 12, 2019. The Orange Line elevator was completed on March 1, 2021, with the commuter rail platform elevator then closing for replacement. The new commuter rail platform opened on April 5, 2021 – in connection with new schedules that had all trains stopping at Ruggles – with the new busway elevator opening the same week. The Forsyth Street elevator reopened on May 11, 2021. The Commuter Rail elevator ultimately reopened on December 6, 2021, with the remainder of the project including the rebuilt busway elevator completed later that month.

A $93 million second phase of the project is planned. The Columbus Avenue will be made accessible, with a covered ramp to the concourse and an improved pathway to the lower busway. A new footbridge will be constructed between the lower busway and the commuter rail island platform; the northeast portion of that platform will be restored (as had been planned in the first phase). A new ramp will connect the Orange Line platform to the northeast side of the concourse, with a new set of faregates added there, and the exit-only stairs from the platform will be rebuilt. Design reached 100% in August 2022; due to inflation and other factors, projected construction costs were $25 million higher than planned. The agency is seeking additional funding, and may split the work into two contracts, with code compliance and accessibility prioritized.

Bus connections

Ruggles also serves as a major transfer point and terminal for MBTA bus services. Most routes enter a deboarding platform from Ruggles Street and proceed to a below-grade boarding area which exits back onto Ruggles; some routes enter and/or exit on a side connection to Columbus Avenue and Tremont Street.

: Harbor Point–
:  or Kane Square–Ruggles station
: Fields Corner station– or Ruggles station
: –Ruggles station via Talbot Ave
: Ashmont station–Ruggles station via Washington Street
: –Ruggles station
: Ruggles station–
: –Ruggles station
: Franklin Park–Ruggles station
: Central Square, Cambridge–
: –Ruggles station
: Beth Israel Deaconess Hospital–

References

External links

MBTA – Ruggles
MBTA – Ruggles Station Improvements
Google Maps Street View: Forsyth Street entrance, Ruggles Street entrance, Columbus Avenue entrance

Orange Line (MBTA) stations
Railway stations in Boston
Stations on the Northeast Corridor
MBTA Commuter Rail stations in Boston
Railway stations in the United States opened in 1987
Stations along Old Colony Railroad lines
Northeastern University
Roxbury, Boston
Stations along Boston and Providence Railroad lines
Railway stations in Massachusetts at university and college campuses